Penton is an unincorporated community located within Alloway Township in Salem County, New Jersey, United States.  The community is the site of the historic Penton Chapel.

History
William Penton received  of land from John Fenwick. William and Daniel Penton lived on a section of this land.  The area was later named after a Penton family member (either Daniel or Abner), and was known as Penton Abbey, Pentonville, and Penton. Burton Penton, who died there around 1795, stated Guineatown was the name of the village.  His granddaughter suggested the name Penton when the post office was established.

The village was known for its brickyards.  Some early ones were established by Jacob Thackra, John Bee, and Smith B. Sickler.

An 1834 survey suggested the town was mostly inhabited by negroes.

References

Alloway Township, New Jersey
Unincorporated communities in Salem County, New Jersey
Unincorporated communities in New Jersey